Kallang Field is a sports field located in Kallang, Singapore. It is part of the Kallang Sports Complex, near where the Singapore Indoor Stadium and the Singapore Sports Hub are.

History
Kallang Field and the adjacent Tennis Centre are part of the Kallang Sports Complex.

Currently home to Singapore’s cricketers, the field is also used for softball.

In 1999, a one-day international tournament involving India, West Indies and Zimbabwe was also hosted here.

2010 Summer Youth Olympics
The Kallang Field was upgraded and converted to host the archery competitions during the 2010 Summer Youth Olympics.

Notes and references

Kallang
Sports venues in Singapore
Venues of the 2010 Summer Youth Olympics
Youth Olympic archery venues